The Diocese of Ipiales is a Latin Church ecclesiastical territory or diocese of the Catholic Church in Southern Colombia. It is a suffragan diocese in the ecclesiastical province of the metropolitan Archdiocese of Popayán.

History 
 Established on 23 September 1964 as Diocese of Ipiales, on territory split off from the Diocese of Pasto

Statistics 
As per 2015, it pastorally served 560,288 Catholics (90.2% of 620,969 total) on 11,089 km2 in 45 parishes and 2 missions with 95 priests (87 diocesan, 8 religious), 2 deacons, 86 lay religious (16 brothers, 70 sisters) and 37 seminarians.

Special churches 

 Its cathedral is the Catedral de San Pedro Mártir, dedicated to the martyr Peter of Verona, in the episcopal see of Ipiales in Nariño Department, near the border with Ecuador 
 It also has a Minor Basilica : Basílica Santuario de Nuestra Señora de Las Lajas, dedicated to Our Lady, in Ipiales, in the same department.

Episcopal Ordinaries 
(all native Colombians)

 Miguel Angel Arce Vivas (31 Oct 1964 – 7 April 1965), next Metropolitan Archbishop of Popayán (Colombia) (1965.04.07 – 1976.10.11), died 1987
 Alfonso Arteaga Yepes (24 July 1965 – 25 Oct 1985), next Bishop of Espinal (Colombia) (1985 – death 1989.10.30); previously Titular Bishop of Auzegera (1962.09.12 – 1965.07.24) as Auxiliary Bishop of Popayán (1962.09.12 – 1965.07.24)
 Ramón Mantilla Duarte, Redemptorists (C.Ss.R.) (25 Oct 1985 – retired 16 Jan 1987), died 2009; previously Titular Bishop of Sala Consilina (1971.01.16 – 1977.04.26) as Vicar Apostolic of Sibundoy (Colombia; see later Promoted as Diocese of Mocoa–Sibundoy) (1971.01.16 – 1977.04.26), Bishop of Garzón (Colombia) (1977.04.26 – 1985.10.25)
 Gustavo Martínez Frías (16 Jan 1987 – 18 March 1999), next Metropolitan Archbishop of Nueva Pamplona (Colombia) (1999.03.18 – death 2009.08.29)
 Arturo de Jesús Correa Toro (29 Jan 2000 – retired 3 February 2018)
 José Saúl Grisales Grisales (3 February 2018 – ...), no previous prelature.

See also 
 List of Catholic dioceses in Colombia
 Roman Catholicism in Colombia

References

Sources and External links
 GCatholic.org, with Google map & HQ satellite photo - data for all sections
 diocesan website (in Spanish)

Roman Catholic dioceses in Colombia
Roman Catholic Ecclesiastical Province of Popayán
Religious organizations established in 1964
Roman Catholic dioceses and prelatures established in the 20th century